The Lionel Conacher Award is an annual award given to Canada's male athlete of the year.  The sports writers of the Canadian Press (CP) first conducted a poll to determine the nation's top athlete, of either gender, in 1932. Separate polls for the best male and female athletes were conducted beginning the following year. The CP formalized the poll into an award in 1978, presenting their winner a plaque. It was named after Lionel Conacher, a multi-sport champion whom the news organization had named its top athlete of the half-century in 1950.  The award is separate from the Northern Star Award, in which a select panel of sports writers vote for their top overall athlete.

The poll was suspended for four years during the Second World War after the CP decided it could not name a sporting "hero" at a time when Canadian soldiers were fighting in Europe. Football player Joe Krol became the first repeat winner following the war, earning top spot in both 1946 and 1947. Hockey star Maurice Richard was the first three-time winner in 1958, and baseball pitcher Ferguson Jenkins the first four-time winner in 1974.  Hockey Hall of Famer Wayne Gretzky has won the most Lionel Conacher Awards, finishing top of the poll six times in the 1980s, and in 1999 was named the Canadian Press Athlete of the Century.

The most recent winner is tennis player Felix Auger-Aliassime.

Voting
The winner was originally selected following a straight vote of each writer's top choice.  Golfer Ross Somerville won the inaugural poll after becoming the first Canadian to win the United States Amateur Championship. By 1936, the poll was conducted via a points system where each writer ranked their top three choices.  Their first choice received three points, second choice two, and third choice one point. This points system has remained since. In 2001 golfer Mike Weir defeated hockey player Joe Sakic by two points in one of the closest votes in the award's history.  He did so despite earning 13 fewer first place votes than Sakic.

Historically, the poll has not been limited to Canadians. Foreign-born athletes who were outstanding performers in Canadian sport have also gained consideration.  Football player Fritz Hanson, a native of Minnesota, was named top athlete in 1939, while American Don Jones finished fourth in voting in 1971 on the strength of his performances with the Winnipeg Blue Bombers of the Canadian Football League. The poll became increasingly dominated by professional athletes since the 1960s – only three amateurs won the award between 1965 and 1984.

Winners have represented a broad spectrum of sports. Individual sport winners include weightlifter Doug Hepburn in 1953, figure skater Kurt Browning in 1990 and 1991, and most recently, gymnast Kyle Shewfelt in 2004.  Participants in one of North America's "major league" team sports won each year between 2005 and 2010. National Hockey League player Sidney Crosby and National Basketball Association player Steve Nash have each won three times overall and Major League Baseball player Justin Morneau won in 2008. Overall, hockey players have finished at the top of the annual polls the most times at 26.  Track and field is second with 13 winners and football third with 10.

List of winners

Notes
 Denotes athlete also won the Northern Star Award as Canadian athlete of the year.

 According to the Canadian Press, the award was discontinued between 1942 and 1945 because "sports writers decided athletes cannot rate as heroes while young Canadian pilots, paratroopers and corvette gunners fought for freedom in the shadow of death".

 No winner was announced for the years 1950 or 1999 as the Canadian Press instead voted for athlete of the half-century and century, respectively.

See also

Bobbie Rosenfeld Award
Canadian Press Team of the Year Award
Velma Springstead Trophy

References

External links
 Greatest Sporting Moments: The Bobbie Rosenfeld and Lionel Conacher Award Winners in the Virtual Museum of Canada

Canadian sports trophies and awards
Most valuable player awards